Sejal is a riverfront town in the Amritsar district of the Indian state of Punjab. Beas lies on the banks of the Beas River. Beas town is mostly located in revenue boundary of Budha Theh with parts in villages Dholo Nangal and Wazir Bhullar. Beas railway station is located on the boundaries of beas . And  Budha Theh is a census town in Baba Bakala tehsil of Amritsar district.

Geography

It is located on the G.T. Road (from Kolkata to Afghanistan), in the Amritsar district in Punjab state of India. The nearest city is Kapurthala to the southwest. The holy and historical city of the Amritsar lies to its northwest, and Jalandhar (38 km) is situated to its southeast.

Radha Soami Satsang Beas

The headquarters of Radha Soami Satsang Beas is located just north of Beas town. The town is known as Dera Baba Jaimal Singh and is located in the east.
Every year, millions of Radha Soami followers travel to Beas to attend satsangs (discourses) often held at the Dera for weeks at a time.
Furthermore, there is also the Maharaj Sawan Singh Charitable Hospital, which was constructed in the 1980s by the Maharaj Jagat Singh Medical Relief Society. Since its inauguration, it has served countless patients free of cost. It is located in the center of beas town on the G.T. Road.

Transport
Air
The nearest airport is Sri Guru Ram Dass Jee International Airport located in Amritsar about 57 km away. 
Dera beas has its own little airport too.
Rail
The town of Beas is well connected through Beas Junction railway station to the major cities of Punjab and India. The station was rated  as the cleanest and public friendly one in India in 2019 by NGO INTACT.

Road
National Highway 3 which was previously numbered as NH 1, passes through Beas town connecting it to the major cities of Punjab and India.

See also
 INS Beas frigate

References

 Cities and towns in Amritsar district